Heosphora tanybela is a moth in the family Pyralidae. The species was first described by Alfred Jefferis Turner in 1947. It is found in Australia.

References 

Moths of Australia
Taxa named by Alfred Jefferis Turner
Moths described in 1947